This is a list of Indonesian football transfers featuring at least one Liga 1 club. The pre-season transfer window will be opened from 15 February to 9 May 2019 while the mid-season transfer window will be opened from 19 August to 16 September 2019, despite some contracts were already signed before the window. Free agent could join any club at any time.

Transfers 
All clubs without a flag are Indonesian clubs.

Pre-season 
Below is the list of transfer that occur after 2018 season ends until the first transfer window is closed.

Mid-season 
Below is the list of transfer that occur during 2019 season (after first transfer window is closed) until the end of the season.

References 

2019 Liga 1
Liga 1 (Indonesia)
Liga 2 (Indonesia)
Liga 3 (Indonesia)
Transfers
Lists of Indonesian football transfers
Indonesia
Indonesia